Piscarinines are bioactive alkaloid isolates of Penicillium piscarium NKM F-961  and Penicillium piscarium Westling  that belong to a class of naturally occurring 2,5-diketopiperazines.
The cytotoxic dehydroproline tryptophan derivatives piscarinines A and B were shown to be active against the prostate cancer cell line LNCAP  (IC50 values were 2.2 and 1.9 μg/mL for piscarinine A and B, respectively).

References

Diketopiperazines
Indole alkaloids
Piscarinine